Dr. Portia Sabin is president of the independent record label Kill Rock Stars, and has been involved in the leadership of music industry associations American Association of Independent Music (A2IM) and World Independent Network (WIN).

Career
While getting her Ph.D. in Anthropology & Education from Columbia University, Sabin played drums in several NYC bands before moving to Olympia, Washington, to research her dissertation.  She began working at Kill Rock Stars in 2000 and started her own artist management company, Shotclock Management, in 2001. From 2005 through March 2008 Sabin managed dance/punk band The Gossip.  In 2006 Sabin left her postdoctoral fellowship at the University of Washington to run Kill Rock Stars. She has been on the board of the American Association of Independent Music (A2IM) since 2011, and continues as a board member of World Independent Network (WIN).  In 2011-12 Sabin chaired the organizing committee of A2IM's inaugural Libera Awards, an awards show celebrating independent labels and artists.

As the president of Kill Rock Stars, Sabin is credited with integrating the artists from sister experimental label 5 Rue Christine into the Kill Rock Stars roster and focusing more on artist development. Companies such as CD Baby have shared her advice to their touring musicians to help them appeal to labels. In 2011, Sabin relocated the company from Lacey, Washington, to the Olympic Mills Commerce Center in Portland, Oregon. Under Sabin's direction, in 2012 Kill Rock Stars began releasing albums from prominent stand up comedians alongside its musical releases and Sabin has stated "I really feel like comedy is the new punk rock".

In December 2014, renowned comedian Zach Broussard named Sabin as one of the top 1,000 comedians of 2014.

In 2017, Sabin was elected to a three-year term on the board of A2IM.

On August 8, 2019, it was announced Sabin would succeed James Donio as president of The Music Business Association effective September 3, 2019.

Sabin is married to Kill Rock Stars’ co-founder Slim Moon.

References 

Year of birth missing (living people)
Living people
American music industry executives
Teachers College, Columbia University alumni
American anthropologists
People from Olympia, Washington
University of Washington people
Talent managers
Place of birth missing (living people)